Malý Slivník is a village and municipality in Prešov District in the Prešov Region of eastern Slovakia.

History
In historical records, the village was first mentioned in 1248.

Geography

Population 
It has a population of about 1,022 people (2020-12-31).

References

External links
 
 
https://www.webcitation.org/5QjNYnAux?url=http://www.statistics.sk/mosmis/eng/run.html

Villages and municipalities in Prešov District
Šariš
Romani communities in Slovakia